François Genet (1640–1702) was a Roman Catholic prelate who served as Bishop of Vaison (1686–1702).

Biography
François Genet was born in Avignon, France, on 16 October 1640.
He was ordained a deacon on 19 September 1665 and ordained a priest on 19 December 1665.
On 18 March 1686, he was appointed during the papacy of Pope Innocent XI as Bishop of Vaison.
On 25 March 1686, he was consecrated bishop by Alessandro Crescenzi, Cardinal-Priest of Santa Prisca, with Giuseppe Eusanio, Titular Bishop of Porphyreon, and Pier Antonio Capobianco, Bishop Emeritus of Lacedonia, serving as co-consecrators.
He served as Bishop of Vaison until his death on 17 October 1702.

References 

17th-century French Roman Catholic bishops
18th-century French Roman Catholic bishops
Bishops appointed by Pope Innocent XI
1640 births
1702 deaths
Clergy from Avignon